Josef von Smola may refer to:

 Josef von Smola (1764–1820), officer
 Josef von Smola (1805–1856), Austrian officer